Flavus is the Latin word for yellow or blond and has given the name to many, more or less yellow, objects:

 Subrius Flavus, a failed Roman conspirator against the Emperor Nero
 Flavus, brother of Arminius

See also 
 Flavius
 Flava (disambiguation)
 Flavum
 Flavin
 Flavonoids
 Flavoprotein

la:Flavus